Attorney General Little may refer to:

John Little (congressman) (1837–1900), Attorney General of Ohio
Joseph Ignatius Little (1835–1902), Attorney General of Newfoundland
Philip Francis Little (1824–1897), Attorney General of Newfoundland

See also
General Little (disambiguation)